Chennai–Thiruvallur High Road (CTH Road), formerly known as Madras–Thiruvallur High Road (or MTH Road), is one of the chief routes connecting the northwestern suburbs of Chennai, India. Starting from Padi Junction, the road connects the neighbourhoods of Padi, Ambattur, Thirumullaivoyil, Avadi, Pattabiram, Thirunindravur, and Thiruvallur. It is one of the four national highways that radiates out of Chennai city and is part of National Highway 205.

The road, however, is narrow with a width of 8 to 10 metres as its widest stretches. Over 100,000 passenger car units use the road every day.

Tallest Building on the stretch
Tidel Park in Avadi with 21 floors would be the tallest building in CTH road.

The road
The road begins at Padi junction in Chennai and runs about 22 km in the Chennai metropolitan area (CMA) up to Thirunindravur, from where it runs a further 59 km to reach Tiruttani. According to official CMDA records, this road is supposed to be 32 meters wide or 100 ft wide, but currently it is only 10–12 meters or 30 ft wide in many stretches.

Developments
In 2013, the government announced that the 22-km stretch of the road between Padi and Thiruninravur would be widened into a six-lane facility. It was announced that in the first phase, the road would be developed into a four-lane facility at a cost of  980 million. However, some traders' federations, including the Tamil Nadu Vanigar Sangankalin Peravai, were against the proposal to make it a six-lane road for about a decade.

On 4 October 2013, the Tamil Nadu Highways department issued a GO extending the entire stretch of the road till Tirutani to 6 lanes at a cost of  1,680 million, by means of land acquisition from 12 villages. In the first phase, the road will be widened to 100 ft (4 lanes) with center median at a cost of  980 million.

As of 30 June 2014, CTH Road is being re-laid end to end and for the first time in history of this road, a proper center median is placed. Tamil Nadu Government, under Jayalalitha is delivering to the safety and security of millions of residents along this stretch by properly developing this road, which has been languishing for the past 20 years. Local residents cheer the move. 4 Laning is currently underway and 6 laning planning is in full swing. Nine out of the 13 revenue villages in this 22 km stretch have submitted the proper legal documents. Heavy Encroachments on government land on both sides of the road in Ambattur OT and in few other stretches are still creating issues to the commuters, but residents are determined to shun these encroachment traders who are creating hell and havoc for millions of residents who travel in this stretch. Many thousand innocent people die in this stretch due to these encroachment traders. Residents continue to praise the work of Chief Minister, the TN State highway authorities and honest officers of the local municipality, who are helping to re-laying this road, rather than budging for the pressure from politically affiliated encroachment traders.

Road Over Bridges
In 2019, three flyovers were planned on the 22-km road at three junctions, viz. the Korattur Road junction, the Vanagaram Road junction, and the Mount Poonamallee–Avadi Road junction at a total cost of ₹8,500 million.
 Inner Ring Road (Crossing @ Padi)
 Chennai ByPass  (Crossing @ Ambattur Indl Estate)
 Ambattur OT (RLY Bridge) To be Extended to 6 way lane Soon
 Outer Ring Road (ORR)  (Crossing @ Pattabiram)
 Poonamallee - Periyapalayam (crossing @ Thirunindravur)
 Pheripheral Ring Road (PRR)  (Crossing @ Thozhur)

National Highway
In 2021, Central Govt Planned to Create Surat - Chennai Business Corridor The expressway will start from Surat in Gujarat, pass through six states, districts and their states, and terminate at Chennai, Tamil Nadu For This they undertake Thiruninravur - Thiruvallur Strech From Tn State Highway Department to create 4 lane New highway

See also

 Transport in Chennai

References 

Roads in Chennai